The Typhonian Order, previously known as the Typhonian Ordo Templi Orientis (TOTO), is a self-initiatory magical organization based in the United Kingdom that focuses on magical and Typhonian concepts. It was originally led by British occultist Kenneth Grant (1924–2011) and his partner Steffi Grant, and is now believed to be led by their deputy Michael Staley.

The Typhonian Order is among the most well-known Thelemic magical orders, primarily due to the publications of Kenneth Grant. In particular, it has influenced Dragon Rouge and was instrumental in the creation of Nema Andahadna's Maat Magick movement. Grant was also responsible for naming the left-hand path Luciferian order known as The Order of Phosphorous run by Michael Ford.

While the group is known to still promote the Crowleyan Law of Thelema, it is said to also focus on exploration of foreign intelligence such as extraterrestrial life and daemons, and on the darker aspects of occult existence.

Origins
The original Ordo Templi Orientis (O.T.O) was founded by the wealthy German industrialist Carl Kellner. After Kellner's death in 1905, Theodor Reuss became Outer Head of the Order.

In 1920, Reuss suffered a stroke, leading Aleister Crowley to question his competence to continue as Outer Head of the Order. By 1921, Crowley and Reuss were exchanging angry letters, culminating in Reuss' expulsion of Crowley from O.T.O. Crowley then informed Reuss that he was proclaiming himself Outer Head of the Order. Reuss died in 1923 without naming a successor, and Crowley was subsequently elected and ratified as Outer Head of the Order in a Conference of Grand Masters in 1925. World War II then intervened, destroying the European branches of O.T.O. and driving its members underground. Karl Germer was incarcerated by the Nazis. By the end of the war, the sole surviving O.T.O. organization was Agapé Lodge in California, where Germer moved after he was released from internment in 1941.

Crowley's succession
After Crowley's death, Germer was his unchallenged successor for some time, and recognized and endorsed Grant's status as a IX° (Ninth Degree) adept in 1948. However Grant later claimed that his assumption of the XI° (Eleventh Degree) was confirmed in 1946, presumably by Crowley, the same year that he was initiated into the A∴A∴, an associated Thelemic magical order created by Crowley in 1907 after leaving the Hermetic Order of the Golden Dawn.

In 1954, Grant began the work of founding the New Isis Lodge, which became operational in 1955 when Grant announced his discovery of a "Sirius/Set current" in a new manifesto upon which the lodge would be based. Karl Germer disliked this new manifesto so much that he expelled Grant from the O.T.O. Grant responded by declaring himself the Outer Head of the Order, assuming the XII° degree, and taking his supporters into schism against those still following Germer. Grant's group henceforth became informally known as the "Typhonian Ordo Templi Orientis," absorbing the New Isis Lodge in 1962, around the same time that Germer died without formally naming a successor as Head of O.T.O.

A document published in 1998 in Volume 2, Number 2 of Starfire purported to demonstrate that Crowley appointed Grant as Outer Head of the Order in 1947, before Crowley's demise:. A statement published in March 2009 in Volume 2, Number 3 of Starfire, however, acknowledges that it has subsequently been established the document was a fake and identifies "the perpetrator".

See also
 Magical organization

References

Citations

Works cited

Further reading
 
 

Fraternal orders
Left-Hand Path
Magical organizations
Thelema